The 2004–05 season was the 92nd season in the existence of CD Tenerife and the club's third consecutive season in the second division of Spanish football. In addition to the domestic league, Tenerife participated in this season's edition of the Copa del Rey. The season covered the period from 1 July 2004 to 30 June 2005.

Competitions

Overview

Segunda División

League table

Results summary

Results by round

Matches

Copa del Rey

Statistics

Goalscorers

References

CD Tenerife seasons
Tenerife